Centro Juventud Sionista, or simply Sionista, is a basketball club based in Paraná, Argentina. The team currently plays in the Liga Nacional de Básquet (LNB), using the Estadio Moisés Flesler as its home arena.

Players

Current roster

Eric Hardy

External links
Official website 
LNB website section 

Basketball teams in Argentina
Basketball teams established in 1930